The Annals of Tropical Paediatrics is a medical journal devoted to paediatrics, including safety issues. It is published by Maney Publishing for the Liverpool School of Tropical Medicine, and has been published since 1981.

According to Ulrich's, it is included in BIOSIS, EMBASE, MEDLINE, and Scopus. It is distributed by Ingenta Connect, ProQuest, Cengage and EBSCO.

Publications established in 1981
Pediatrics journals
Taylor & Francis academic journals
English-language journals
Academic journals associated with universities and colleges